The Victory-class corvettes are multi-purpose corvettes based on the MGB 62 design by Germany's Lürssen shipyard for the Republic of Singapore Navy (RSN). The six ships were commissioned between 1990 and 1991 and form the Eighth Flotilla of the RSN.

History
In the 1960s and 1970s, the RSN was primarily concerned with coast guard duties. From the late 1970s, however, pressure from senior naval officers led to planning for expanded naval responsibilities and capabilities. Singapore's growing regional trade led to a top-level review of the RSN's mission, when the navy was assigned the role of defending Singapore's sea lines of communication (SLOCs). As part of a subsequent expansion programme, the RSN ordered a squadron of missile corvettes from Lürssen Werft in 1983. The first, RSS Victory, was built and launched in Germany while the remaining five were built locally by Singapore Shipbuilding & Engineering (now Singapore Technologies (ST) Marine). The corvettes, equipped with sonar and torpedoes, were the first class of ship in the RSN to have anti-submarine capabilities.

In 1996, the corvettes were fitted with two sets of 8-cell Barak I launchers, a second fire control radar on the platform aft of the mast and an optronic director on the bridge roof. Rudder roll stabilisation was also retrofitted to improve sea-keeping qualities.

In 2009, it was announced that the corvettes would undergo a Life Extension Programme. On 23 August 2011, the upgraded RSS Valiant conducted a live-firing exercise of its Barak missile, while on Exercise CARAT with the United States Navy.

In 2012, the class is to be upgraded with a single ScanEagle UAV, RSS Valiant was the first to be so outfitted. This upgrade however, saw the removal of their anti-submarine capabilities.

In 2018 the Ministry of Defence announced that all six corvettes will be replaced by new combat ships from 2025 onwards.

Vessels

References

External links

MINDEF - Republic of Singapore Navy - Naval Assets

 

Corvette classes
Corvettes of Germany
Missile boats of Germany
Corvettes of the Republic of Singapore Navy